is a station in the Tokyo Sakura Tram . It is located in Toshima, Tokyo. Tokyo Metro Zoshigaya Station on the Fukutoshin line is built directly underneath the station.

Lines 
Tokyo Sakura Tram